4th Uruguayan Film Critics Association Awards
The 4th Uruguayan Film Critics Association Awards were held in 2004.

Winners
Best Film: The Barbarian Invasions (Les Invasions barbares) (Canada/France)
Best Latin American Film: Whisky (Uruguay/Argentina/Germany/Spain)

References

External links
IMDb - Uruguayan Film Critics Association 2004

 

Uruguayan Film Critics Association Awards
2004 film awards